Estolomimus transversus is a species of beetle in the family Cerambycidae. It was described by Martins and Galileo in 2002. It is known from Brazil.

References

Desmiphorini
Beetles described in 2002